Marcin Cabaj (born May 23, 1980 in Kraków) is a Polish footballer (goalkeeper) who currently plays for Wiślanie Jaśkowice.

Career

Club
His previous clubs have included Wanda Nowa Huta, Krakus Nowa Huta, Górnik Łęczna, KSZO Ostrowiec Świętokrzyski. He made his Kraków debut on September 10, 2004 against Górnik Zabrze.

In May 2011, he joined Israeli club Hapoel Be'er Sheva on a three-year contract.

On 2 August 2019, Cabaj joined Wiślanie Jaśkowice.

References

External links
 

1980 births
Living people
Polish footballers
Górnik Łęczna players
KSZO Ostrowiec Świętokrzyski players
MKS Cracovia (football) players
Hutnik Nowa Huta players
Hapoel Be'er Sheva F.C. players
Polonia Bytom players
Sandecja Nowy Sącz players
Garbarnia Kraków players
Polish expatriate footballers
Expatriate footballers in Israel
Polish expatriate sportspeople in Israel
Association football goalkeepers
Footballers from Kraków
Israeli Premier League players